Kevin Byrne may refer to:

 Kevin Byrne (mayor) (born 1949), mayor of Cairns, Queensland, Australia
 Kevin Byrne (New York politician) (born 1984), member of the New York State Assembly
 Kevin P. Byrne, United States Navy officer